Baumbach may refer to:

People
 Dick Baumbach (born 1943), American award winning journalist
 Friedrich Baumbach (born 1935), German chess grandmaster
 Frederick August Baumbach (1753–1813), German musician
 Hubertus von Baumbach (born 1966/1967), German businessman
 Jonathan Baumbach (born 1933), American author
 Lydia Baumbach (1924–1991), South African classical scholar specializing in Mycenaean studies
 Maren Baumbach (born 1981), German handball player
 Max Baumbach (1859–1915),  German sculptor
 Noah Baumbach (born 1969), American filmmaker
 Paul Baumbach, American politician from Delaware
 Rudolf Baumbach (1840–1905), German poet
 Werner Baumbach (1916–1953), bomber pilot in the German Luftwaffe

Other
 Ransbach-Baumbach, town in the Westerwaldkreis, in Rhineland-Palatinate, Germany
 Ransbach-Baumbach (Verbandsgemeinde), Verbandsgemeinde ("collective municipality") in the Westerwaldkreis, in Rhineland-Palatinate, Germany
 Baumbach Lake, lake in Douglas County, Minnesota, United States
 Baumbach Building, historic building in Milwaukee, Wisconsin, United States